The mini Majesty of the Seas is a model ship constructed in Morsbach, France, by François Zanella.

The vessel is a 1/8th scale model of Royal Caribbean International's 1992 cruise ship, Majesty of the Seas (also built in France, by Chantiers de l'Atlantique). The mini Majesty is 33.5 metres in length, with a width of 4.75 metres and a draft of 1.06 metres. The model has a displacement of 90 tons. In addition to being a scale replica model, the mini Majesty is a fully functional canal boat. The vessel's draft is small enough to permit admittance to most European canals, although in some cases the height of the ship needs to, and can, be modified.

It took François Zanella, a mine builder, 11 years to build the model, beginning in 1993. The model was built on land opposite his home in Morsbach, which he purchased specifically for the project. After construction was completed in June 2005, the model was transported to Sarreguemines to be launched and christened. François Zanella's fame in France stemmed from the show Thalassa on France 3, which followed his activities during the construction period. He died in 2015.

Chronology
 1993 First blueprint.
 1994 Construction starts.
 June 23, 2005 – ship launch in
Sarreguemines and christening by navigator Maud Fontenoy.

External links 

 Le Républicain Lorrain special edition dated June 21, 2005
 The web site of Cindy, one of François Zanella's daughters
 Sarreguemines city official web site, describing the three-day travel of the Majesty of the Seas from Morsbach construction site to ship launching.

Notes 

Model boats
Passenger ships of France
2005 works
Royal Caribbean International